Umboza were a house duo from the United Kingdom composed of Stuart Crichton and Michael Kilkie. They recorded for Positiva Records.

Umboza's 1995 single "Cry India", based on a sample of Lionel Richie's hit "All Night Long", was a hit both in the U.S. and the UK. The song peaked at #16 on the Billboard Dance Club Play chart and #19 on the UK Singles Chart. A second single, "Sunshine", based on a sample of the Gipsy Kings hit "Bamboléo", proved to be their biggest UK hit, reaching #14 in 1996. The track appeared on numerous compilations including Now 34 and Dancemania 3.

Discography

Singles

References

External links
Umboza at Discogs

English house music duos
British Eurodance groups
Male musical duos
Positiva Records artists